The Rock 'n' Roll San Jose Half Marathon is an annual half marathon race which takes place in San Jose, California in the United States. It is part of the Rock 'n' Roll Marathon Series of road running competitions organized by the IRONMAN Group, part of Wanda Sports Holdings.

Incidents

In 2009 two runners died towards the end of the race.

Past winners

References

External links
Official website

Half marathons in the United States
Recurring sporting events established in 2010